Statistics of Primera Fuerza in season 1933-34.

Overview
It was contested by 6 teams, and Club España won the championship.

League standings

Playoff

Championship Playoffs Results

Top goalscorers
Players sorted first by goals scored, then by last name.

References
Mexico - List of final tables (RSSSF)

1933-34
Mex
1933–34 in Mexican football